Tutak (also Romanized as Tūtak) is a village in Ghaniabad Rural District, in the Central District of Ray County, Tehran Province, Iran. At the 2006 census, its population was 161, in 38 families.

References 

Populated places in Ray County, Iran